WCIL can refer to:

 WCIL (AM), a radio station at 1020 AM located in Carbondale, Illinois
 WCIL-FM, a radio station at 101.5 FM located in Carbondale, Illinois